Ribera d'Ebre is a comarca (county) in Catalonia, Spain. in the Terres de l'Ebre, and that extends to both sides of the river Ebro between the reservoir of Riba-roja and Miravet. It belongs to the province of Tarragona and its capital is Móra d'Ebre.

GDP_nominal_per_capita = 44.400€ ($50.854)

Municipalities

References

External links
Official website 

 
Comarques of the Province of Tarragona